Darkest Russia is a 1917 American silent drama film directed by Travers Vale and starring Alice Brady, John Bowers and J. Herbert Frank.

Cast
 Alice Brady as Ilda Barosky 
 John Bowers as Alexis Nazimoff 
 J. Herbert Frank as Constantine Karischeff 
 Norbert Wicki as Ivan Barosky 
 Jack Drumier as Count Paul Nazimoff 
 Kate Lester as Katherine Karischeff 
 Lillian Cook as Olga 
 Frank DeVernon as Grand Duke 
 Boris Korlin as Barosky 
 Herbert Barrington as Nicholai

References

Bibliography
 Goble, Alan. The Complete Index to Literary Sources in Film. Walter de Gruyter, 1999.

External links
 

1917 films
1917 drama films
1910s English-language films
American silent feature films
Silent American drama films
Films directed by Travers Vale
American black-and-white films
World Film Company films
Films set in Russia
1910s American films